The hooded pitta (Pitta sordida) is a passerine bird in the family Pittidae. It is common in eastern and southeastern Asia and maritime Southeast Asia, where it lives in several types of forests as well as on plantations and other cultivated areas. It is a green bird with a black head and chestnut crown. It forages on the ground for insects and their larvae, and also eats berries. It breeds between February and August, the pair being strongly territorial and building their nest on the ground. Incubation and care of the fledglings is done by both parents. The bird has a wide range, and the International Union for Conservation of Nature has assessed its conservation status as being of "least concern".

Taxonomy
The hooded pitta was described by the German zoologist Philipp Statius Müller in 1776 and given the binomial name Turdus sordidus. Statius Müller's description was based on a plate showing the "Merle des Philippines" published by Comte de Buffon in his Planches Enluminées D'Histoire Naturelle. The species is now placed in the genus Pitta that was erected by the French ornithologist Louis Jean Pierre Vieillot in 1816. The specific epithet sordida is Latin for "shabby" or "dirty".

Twelve subspecies are recognised:
 P. s. cucullata Hartlaub, 1843 – north India to south China and Indochina
 P. s. abbotti Richmond, 1902 – Nicobar Islands
 P. s. mulleri (Bonaparte, 1850) – Malay Peninsula, Sumatra, Java, Borneo and Sulu Archipelago
 P. s. bangkana Schlegel, 1863 – Bangka and Belitung Islands (east of Sumatra)
 P. s. sordida (Statius Müller, PL, 1776) – Philippines (except Palawan group)
 P. s. palawanensis Parkes, 1960 – Palawan Islands (west Philippines)
 P. s. sanghirana Schlegel, 1866 – Sangir Island (northeast of Sulawesi)
 P. s. forsteni (Bonaparte, 1850) – north Sulawesi
 P. s. goodfellowi White, C.M.N., 1937 – Aru Islands (off south New Guinea)
 P. s. mefoorana Schlegel, 1874 – island of Numfor (off northwest New Guinea)
 P. s. rosenbergii Schlegel, 1871 – island of Biak (off northwest New Guinea)
 P. s. novaeguineae Müller, S. & Schlegel, 1845 – west Papuan islands, New Guinea and Karkar Island (off north New Guinea)

Behaviour

It has a black head, chestnut crown and green body and wings. Its diet consists of various insects (including their larvae), which they hunt on the ground, and berries. In the breeding period, which lasts from February to August, they build nests on the ground; both parent take care of the eggs and the fledglings. They are highly territorial and their fluty double-noted whistle calls ("qweeek-qweeek") can be constantly heard from their territories, sometimes throughout the nights.

The International Union for Conservation of Nature is concerned in particular about the ongoing loss of habitat that this bird suffers, which is reducing its numbers, but has rated it as being a "least concern species" because the rate of population decline is insufficient to warrant a threatened category.

In captivity, hooded pittas mix well with other species although they may be aggressive toward other pittas when breeding.  In London Zoo they are kept in a large walk-through aviary in the restored Blackburn Pavilion bird house, while at the Durrell Wildlife Park they are in a large walk-through exhibit with birds such as Palawan peacock-pheasants and white-rumped shamas.

Gallery

References

External links 
 BirdLife Species Factsheet

hooded pitta
Birds of Nepal
Birds of Eastern Himalaya
Birds of Southeast Asia
Birds of New Guinea
Least concern biota of Asia
hooded pitta